The 1989 Oklahoma State Cowboys football team represented the Oklahoma State University during the 1989 NCAA Division I-A football season. They participated as members of the Big 8 Conference. They played their home games at Lewis Field in Stillwater, Oklahoma. They were coached by head Coach Pat Jones.

Schedule

Personnel

Season summary

at Tulsa

at Ohio State

Texas Tech

Wyoming

at Oklahoma

Kansas State

Nebraska

at Missouri

at Kansas

Colorado

Iowa State

References

Oklahoma State
Oklahoma State Cowboys football seasons
Oklahoma State Cowboys football